The Isthmus of Catalina Island is a 770-meter (842 yards) section of land that joins the northwestern portion of Santa Catalina Island to the main part of the island. Part of the isthmus is occupied by the town of Two Harbors, named for two harbors on either side of the isthmus, Isthmus Cove and Catalina Harbor. Two Harbors lies on the leeward side facing Isthmus Cove. The northern part of Santa Catalina contains about one sixth (31.7 km²) of the entire island's land mass.

External links
 Panoramic photo (Isthmus Cove
 View from a helicopter
 Detailed map

Santa Catalina Island (California)
Catalina
Landforms of the Channel Islands of California
Landforms of Los Angeles County, California